The following highways are numbered 619:

Costa Rica
 National Route 619

United States